Fox River Mall is an enclosed super-regional shopping center located in Grand Chute, Wisconsin, United States, which serves the Appleton, Wisconsin metropolitan area. It is a major driver of the local economy and its construction helped spur the growth of the Grand Chute shopping district, which is today known as the "shopping capital of Wisconsin". At 1.21 million square feet, it is the largest mall in the state.

The anchor stores are Macy's, JCPenney, Target, and Scheels All Sports. There are 2 vacant anchor stores that were once Sears and Younkers.

History 
Before the mall was built, the Appleton Metropolitan area was considered to be the only major metropolitan area in the United States that did not have a major regional mall to strengthen its economy. Local business leaders got together and encouraged a developer to build a mall. At this time the west side of Interstate 41 was largely undeveloped, making it the perfect place to build the mall. Since its opening, this region has been greatly developed and brings many visitors and businesses to the Appleton Metropolitan area. Today it contributes about 1 billion dollars annually to the local economy.

The mall opened on July 18, 1984, with one anchor store, Sears, along with 67 other stores, a movie theater, and a Walgreens drugstore. Expanded several times in its history, including in 1991 when Dayton's built a new location, which eventually became Marshall Field's, and is now Macy's. With the last major renovation occurring in 2004, it became the largest mall in Wisconsin in 2014, with 1.2 million square feet.

In May 2018, the mall's Younkers location closed. It had been an anchor tenant for 26 years. 

On December 28, 2018, it was announced that Sears would be closing as part of a plan to close 80 stores nationwide. The store closed on March 17, 2019. 

The Sears and Younkers stores are expected to be redeveloped by the mall in the future, though nothing has yet been announced.

Facilities 
It is the largest shopping mall in Wisconsin, with over 140 stores. It has a food court called the Northwoods Café, which includes more than a dozen counter vendors. Fox River Plaza is a strip mall on the premises. 

Fox River Mall is owned by Brookfield Properties.

References

External links
Official website

Buildings and structures in Outagamie County, Wisconsin
Shopping malls in Wisconsin
Tourist attractions in Outagamie County, Wisconsin
Brookfield Properties
Shopping malls established in 1984